Men's Overall World Cup 1990/1991

In Men's Overall World Cup all results count. The parallel slalom did not count for the Overall World Cup.

References
 fis-ski.com

World Cup
FIS Alpine Ski World Cup overall titles